Mesocelis is a genus of moths in the family Lasiocampidae erected by Jacob Hübner in 1820. It is monotypic, with the single species, Mesocelis monticola, described by the same author in the same year. It is found in South Africa.

References

Endemic moths of South Africa
Lasiocampidae
Monotypic moth genera